Bursera lancifolia is a Mexican species of trees in the frankincense family in the soapwood order. It is widespread in western Mexico from Sonora to Oaxaca.

Bursera lancifolia is a small tree. Leaves are pinnately compound with 3-7 leaflets, hairless with small teeth along the edges.

References

lancifolia
Flora of Mexico
Plants described in 1843